is a tiny asteroid and fast rotator, classified as near-Earth object of the Apollo group, approximately 5 meters in diameter. It was first observed by the Mount Lemmon Survey in October 2010, when the asteroid crossed through the Earth-moon system and had a close encounter with Earth.

Orbit and classification 

 orbits the Sun at a distance of 0.7–3.2 AU once every 2 years and 9 months (1,011 days). Its orbit has an eccentricity of 0.64 and an inclination of 4° with respect to the ecliptic.

The body's observation arc begins with its first observations by the Mount Lemmon Survey and only spans over a period of 3 days until 12 October 2010. It has been observed since then.

Close approach 

It is one of the closest known approaches of an asteroid to Earth, at which time the object appeared at a magnitude of 14. It was first observed by of the Catalina Sky Surveys telescopes north of Tucson, Arizona on 9 October 2010.

It was removed from the Sentry Risk Table on 11 October 2010. The asteroid may have passed  from Earth in October 1979, but the nominal orbit suggests it passed millions of kilometres from Earth in 1979.

Physical characteristics 

 is a stony asteroid, characterized as a Srv subtype.

Rotation period 

Lightcurve analysis gave a well-defined rotation period of 0.0229317 hours (1 minute and 23 seconds) with a brightness amplitude of 0.92 magnitude. A high amplitude typically indicates that the body has an irregular, elongated rather than spherical shape. This result supersedes a previously obtained lightcurve with a shorter period of 0.01167 hours .

Diameter and albedo 

The Collaborative Asteroid Lightcurve Link assumes a standard albedo for stony asteroids of 0.20 and calculates a diameter of  based on an absolute magnitude of 28.9. NASA's press release gave an estimated diameter of 5 to 10 meters (16 to 33 feet).

See also 
 List of asteroid close approaches to Earth, for other close approaches
List of asteroid close approaches to Earth in 2010

Notes

References

External links 
 Asteroid 2010 TD54's Orbit Around the Sun
 Small Asteroid to Pass Within Earth-Moon System Tuesday 10.11.10
 The near-Earth asteroid 2010 TD54: The fastest rotating natural body known in the solar system? 29 Oct 2010
 Asteroid Lightcurve Database (LCDB), query form (info )
 
 
 

Minor planet object articles (unnumbered)
Earth-crossing asteroids

20101012
20101009